Anathallis adenochila is a species of orchid plant native to Brazil.

References 

adenochila
Flora of Brazil
Plants described in 2003